Richard N. Price III (born May 18, 1968) is an American professional golfer who plays on the Nationwide Tour.

Price joined the Nationwide Tour in 1999 where he played until 2001, took a hiatus in 2002 and rejoined in 2003. He won his first title at the Xerox Classic in 2005 but his breakout year came in 2008 when he won the Nationwide Tour Players Cup en route to a 12th-place finish on the money list, earning him his PGA Tour card for 2009. He did not have much success on the PGA Tour and returned to the Nationwide Tour the following year. He has won 20 events on mini tours and he has also played on the Canadian Tour.

Professional wins (22)

Nationwide Tour wins (2)

Nationwide Tour playoff record (1–0)

Other wins (20)
20 wins on mini tours

Results in major championships

DNP = Did not play
CUT = missed the half-way cut
"T" = tied
Yellow background for top-10.

See also
2008 Nationwide Tour graduates

External links

American male golfers
PGA Tour golfers
Korn Ferry Tour graduates
Golfers from Pennsylvania
Golfers from Florida
Methodist Monarchs athletes
Sportspeople from Reading, Pennsylvania
People from Jupiter, Florida
1968 births
Living people